Eustace de Montaut, or Monte Alto, Montalt, Monhaut, or FitzNorman ( 1027 – 1112), was a Breton soldier, and later baron, who fought on the side of the Normans during the Norman Conquest of England in 1066 and for his achievements was granted several manors by the new king, William the Conqueror.

Biography
Eustace was born in the early to mid-11th century, possibly in Monthault, Ille-et-Vilaine, Brittany, to parents whose names are not recorded. Some historians have identified him as Eustace III, Count of Boulogne, but it is most likely that they were separate people. It has often been claimed that Eustace's family were originally the Lords of Montalto in Italy, but there is no evidence of this, and it may simply be based on the Latin form of "de Montaut, "de Monte Alto". Eustace came to England in the years following the Norman Conquest, aiding Hugh Lupus in his conflict with the Welsh. 

Eustace united his forces with those of Hugh Lupus, and together succeeded in subduing the Welsh in the county of Flintshire. Hugh Lupus and Eustace shared the lands they gained, with Eustace receiving the manors of Montalt and Hawarden—both of which are still ruled by his descendants.

Eustace died at an unknown date and was succeeded by his eldest son, Hugh de Montaut.

Family
The identity of any wife of Eustace has not been recorded. She bore Eustace at least three sons: Hugh, Roger and Ralph (or Ranulph). Some sources also mention another son, Peter, Seneschal of Chester.

Issue
Hugh (FitzNorman) de Monte Alto ( 1045 – before 1130) married N.N.
William de Monte Alto (c. 1075 – c. 1141) married Colobella Grant
Robert de Monte Alto (c. 1095 – ?)
Ralph (FitzNorman) de Montaut (c. 1050 – before c. 1141) married N.N.
Robert de Mohaut (c. 1125 – c. 1162) married Leucha FitzNeel de Halton
Ralph de Mohaut (c. 1155 – c. 1200)
Roger de Mohaut (1160 – 1232)
Eustace de Mohaut (1160 – 1232)
Robert de Mohaut (c. 1162 – before c. 1132)
William de Mohaut
John de Mohaut
Matthew de Mohaut
Simon de Mohaut (? – c. 1190) married N.N.
Richard de Montealt, Lord of Riddlesden (? – c. 1240)
Isabel de Montealt
Roger (FitzNorman) de Montaut (c. 1052 – ?)

References

1112 deaths
Anglo-Normans
Norman warriors
1040s births
English people of Breton descent